William C. Griesbach (born January 24, 1954) is a senior judge and former chief judge of the United States District Court for the Eastern District of Wisconsin.  He was appointed to the federal court in 2002, by President George W. Bush, after having served seven years as a Wisconsin circuit court judge in Brown County.

Education and career

Born in Milwaukee, Wisconsin, Griesbach received a Bachelor of Arts degree from Marquette University in 1976 and a Juris Doctor from Marquette University Law School in 1979. He was a law clerk to Judge Bruce F. Beilfuss, Wisconsin Supreme Court from 1979 to 1980. He was a staff attorney of United States Court of Appeals for the Seventh Circuit from 1980 to 1982, thereafter entering private practice in Wisconsin from 1982 to 1987. He was an assistant district attorney in Brown County, Wisconsin, from 1987 to 1995, and a judge on the Brown County Circuit Court from 1995 to 2002.

District court service

On January 23, 2002, Griesbach was nominated by President George W. Bush to a seat on the United States District Court for the Eastern District of Wisconsin. He was confirmed by the United States Senate on April 25, 2002, and received his commission on May 1, 2002. He became Chief Judge on October 31, 2012, and served a 7-year term until October 31, 2019. He assumed senior status on December 31, 2019.

Notable case

In November 2016, Griesbach dissented when Circuit Judge Kenneth Francis Ripple, joined by District Judge Barbara Brandriff Crabb, found that the high number of wasted votes created by the 2011 Wisconsin State Assembly redistricting was unconstitutional partisan gerrymandering.  The opinion was vacated and remanded by the United States Supreme Court on June 18, 2018.

References

External links

 
 

|-

1954 births
Living people
Lawyers from Milwaukee
Marquette University alumni
Marquette University Law School alumni
Wisconsin state court judges
Judges of the United States District Court for the Eastern District of Wisconsin
United States district court judges appointed by George W. Bush
21st-century American judges